The 2007 Hull City Council election took place on 3 May 2007 to elect members of Hull City Council in England. One third of the council was up for election and the Liberal Democrats gained overall control of the council from no overall control. Overall turnout was 27%.

After the election, the composition of the council was
Liberal Democrat 30
Labour 20
Independent 7
Conservative 2

Campaign
Before the election the Liberal Democrats had run the council as a minority administration since the 2006 election. However, by the time of the 2007 election they only had 24 seats on the council as compared to 25 for the Labour party; with 2 Conservatives, 6 in the independent group and 2 other independent councillors making up the council. The Liberal Democrats generally received support from the Conservatives and one of the independent councillors, while Labour usually got support from the independent group. As a result, the election was expected to be close with both main parties hopeful of forming the administration after the election.

All three of the Labour, Liberal Democrat and Conservatives parties contested the 19 seats which were up for election. There were also 11 independent, 6 Green, 3 British National Party and 3 United Kingdom Independence Party candidates. An important issue in the election was poor housing in Hull, with the council planning to spend £200 million on refurbishing council properties. An important division between Labour and the Liberal Democrats was over free school meals, with Labour wanting to extend the 3-year long pilot scheme which saw all primary school pupils get free meals. However the Liberal Democrats planned to reintroduce charges for lunches while keeping breakfasts free.

As the Liberal Democrats were only defending 7 seats and had won the most votes in the 2006 election they were optimistic of making gains. They pointed to the fact that the council had recently received a second star in the council performance ratings, and were also seen as likely to benefit due to the unpopularity of the national Labour Prime Minister Tony Blair, with even the Labour leader on the council saying that "the sooner he goes, the better". The Liberal Democrats targeted the Labour held wards of Drypool, Ings, Newington, Pickering and Sutton, as well as Derringham where the independent councillor Clare Page stood down at the election.

Election result
The results saw the Liberal Democrats gain 6 seats, including 5 from Labour, to hold 30 seats and thus win a majority on the council. 
The Liberal Democrat gains included all 6 wards which they had been targeting, with the results seen as a reflection on the Labour party nationally. The result was welcomed by the national Liberal Democrat leader, Menzies Campbell, who described the result in Hull as "tremendous".

This was the first time any party had a majority on the council since 2002 and also the first time that the Liberal Democrats had ever won a majority in Hull. Meanwhile, Labour, on 20 seats after the election, were in their worst position on the council for nearly 40 years. Following the election defeat the leader of the Labour group on the council, Ken Branson, stood down as leader and was succeeded by Steve Brady.

Ward results

No elections were held in Bricknell, Southcoates East, Southcoates West and St Andrews wards.

References

2007
2007 English local elections
2000s in Kingston upon Hull